Alceo is an Italian male given name, derived from that of Alcaeus of Mytilene. Notable people with this name include:

 Alceo Dossena (1878–1937), Italian sculptor
 Alceo Galliera (1910–1996), Italian conductor and composer
 Alceo Lipizer (1921–1990), Italian football player